Alak Chandra Gupta (born: 1 January 1917) was a former Justice of the Supreme Court of India.

Career
Gupta studied in Bhowanipore Mitra Institution and Presidency College, Kolkata. He passed M.A., LL.B from the University of Calcutta. He was enrolled as an advocate on 31 August 1945 and started practice in Civil, Criminal and Constitutional matters in the Calcutta High Court. In 1964 he was appointed as an Additional Judge of the Calcutta High Court. Justice Gupta became the permanent Judge on 24 February 1966. He was elevated as the Justice of the Supreme Court of India in 1974. In his tenure he was the Chairman of Maruti Commission on the allegations against Sanjay Gandhi. Justice Gupta retired on 1 January 1982 from the judgeship.

References

1917 births
Judges of the Calcutta High Court
Justices of the Supreme Court of India
University of Calcutta alumni
Scholars from Kolkata
Bengali people
20th-century Indian lawyers
20th-century Indian judges
Presidency University, Kolkata alumni
Year of death missing